
Year 473 (CDLXXIII) was a common year starting on Monday (link will display the full calendar) of the Julian calendar. At the time, it was known as the Year of the Consulship of Leo without colleague (or, less frequently, year 1226 Ab urbe condita). The denomination 473 for this year has been used since the early medieval period, when the Anno Domini calendar era became the prevalent method in Europe for naming years.

Events 
 By place 
 Roman Empire 
 March 3 – Gundobad (nephew of Ricimer) nominates Glycerius as emperor of the Western Roman Empire. Emperor Leo I refuses to  recognize him, and chooses Julius Nepos as candidate to the Western throne. 
 October 25 – Leo I grants his grandson Leo II, age 6, the title of Caesar (approximate date). 

 Balkans 
 Theodoric Strabo signs a peace treaty with Leo I, and according to the terms the Goths are paid with an annual tribute of 2,000 pounds of gold. Leo gives him an independent state in Thrace and he obtains the rank of magister militum.
 The Ostrogoths leave Pannonia, and migrate to Macedonia and Moesia, from whence they ravage the Balkans. 

 Europe 
 King Euric orders the invasion of Italy, but is defeated by Glycerius. The Visigoths withdraw to Gaul, and conquer the cities of Arles and Marseille.
 Gundobad returns to Burgundy, where his father Gondioc has died, and becomes king of the Burgundians.

Births 
 Xiao Zhaoye, Chinese emperor of Southern Qi (known as the Prince of Yulin) (d. 494)
 Kavad I, king (shah) of the Sasanian Empire from 488 to 531, with an interruption of two years

Deaths 
 Euthymius the Great, abbot and bishop (b. 377) 
 Gondioc, king of Burgundy (approximate date)

References